Reola is a village in Kambja Parish, Tartu County, Estonia. It is located about 9 km south of Tartu, the second largest city in Estonia, adjacent to Ülenurme and Tõrvandi. Reola is passed by the Tallinn–Tartu–Võru–Luhamaa road (E263) and the Tartu–Koidula railway. Tartu Airport is located on the territory of Reola village. As of 2011 Census, the settlement's population was 174.

The Reola Manor  (Rewold) was mentioned in 1522, now in the adjacent neighbouring Uhti village. Uhti was first mentioned in 1299 as Huchten. The Valge Kõrts (White tavern), from the 19th century, is a frequently 
visited historical attraction that is located near the highway, in Uhti village. The Reola railway station is located about 4 km southeast, in Tõõraste village. The nearest station to Reola is the Uhti railway station.

Institutions and companies operating in Reola include:
Tartu Airport
Estonian Aviation Academy
Reola Gaas, sale of liquid gas
Raitwood, sawn timber products
A.Le Coq's production complex in Reola
Reola Köögiviljad OÜ, vegetable treatment and sale
Reola culture house

References

External links
Tartu Airport
Estonian Aviation Academy
Reola Gaas 
Raitwood
Reola Köögiviljad OÜ 

Villages in Tartu County
Kreis Dorpat